Mattias Elfström (born 8 January 1997) is a Swedish professional ice hockey forward currently playing for Hanhals IF of the Hockeyettan (Div.1). He was drafted by the Detroit Red Wings in the seventh round, 197th overall, in the 2016 NHL Entry Draft.

Elfström played nine games in the Swedish Hockey League for the Malmö Redhawks. Approaching the 2018–19 season, Elfström left Västerviks IK of the HockeyAllsvenskan, moving down a tier to the Hockeyettan with Hanhals IF on September 21, 2018.

Career statistics

References

External links
 

1997 births
Living people
Detroit Red Wings draft picks
Malmö Redhawks players
Nybro Vikings players
Swedish ice hockey forwards
Tyringe SoSS players
Västerviks IK players
Ice hockey people from Stockholm